Dufourea monardae, the monarda dufourea, is a species of sweat bee in the family Halictidae. It is found in North America. It is an oligolectic bee on bee balm plants.

References

Further reading

 

Halictidae
Insects described in 1924